Laura von Bertouch (born 4 December 1980) is a former Australia netball international. Bertouch was a member of the Australia team that won the gold medal at the 2007 World Netball Championships. At club level, Bertouch played for Adelaide Thunderbirds, mainly during the Commonwealth Bank Trophy era. She captained Thunderbirds between 2004 and 2007. Her younger sister, Natalie von Bertouch, is also a former netball player. The two sisters were team mates with both Thunderbirds and Australia.

Early life, family and education
von Bertouch is the daughter of Terry von Bertouch, who during the late 1960s and 1970s played Australian rules football for North Adelaide and Norwood in the South Australian National Football League. Her younger sister, Natalie von Bertouch, is also a former Australia netball international. The Bertouch sisters were both educated at Immanuel College. Bertouch is married to the Australian rules footballer, James Gallagher.

Playing career

Contax
Bertouch and her sister, Natalie von Bertouch, began playing netball aged seven and nine at the Contax Netball Club. In 2000, together with Tracey Neville, the Bertouch sisters were members of the Contax team that won the South Australia Farmers Union League.

Adelaide Thunderbirds
In 1998, Bertouch began playing for Adelaide Thunderbirds. Together with Kathryn Harby-Williams, Jacqui Delaney, Peta Squire and Alex Hodge, she was a member of the Thunderbirds squad that won two Commonwealth Bank Trophy premierships in 1998 and 1999. In 2002 she became a regular member of the Thunderbirds starting seven, playing at wing attack, and forming a strong mid-court combination with her sister, Natalie von Bertouch. She was subsequently named in the Team of the Year for the 2002, 2004, 2005, 2006 and 2007 seasons.  She also captained Thunderbirds between 2004 and 2007. In November 2007 Bertouch announced she was retiring as a netball player. However, she returned to play for Thunderbirds in the 2009 ANZ Championship season.

Australia
Between 2006 and 2007 Bertouch made 18 senior appearances for Australia. She was first included in senior Australia squads in 2002 but a knee injury delayed her making a senior appearance until 2006. She eventually made her senior debut on 22 July 2006 against New Zealand. Along with her sister, Natalie von Bertouch, Bertouch was subsequently a member of the Australia team that won the gold medal at the 2007 World Netball Championships.

Honours
Australia
World Netball Championships
Winners: 2007
Adelaide Thunderbirds
Commonwealth Bank Trophy
Winners: 1998, 1999
Runners Up: 1997, 2000, 2001, 2002, 2006
ANZ Championship
Runners Up: 2009
Contax
South Australia Farmers Union League
Winners: 2000

References

1980 births
Living people
Australian netball players
Australia international netball players
Netball players from South Australia
Adelaide Thunderbirds players
ANZ Championship players
Commonwealth Bank Trophy players
Australian people of German descent
Sportspeople from Adelaide
People educated at Immanuel College, Adelaide
Contax Netball Club players
South Australia state netball league players
2007 World Netball Championships players